Camp Latham was a temporary United States Army tent camp in Los Angeles County, California in operation from fall 1861 to fall 1862 in the military District of Southern California during the American Civil War. Camp Latham was located on land of the Rancho La Ballona, on the south bank of Ballona Creek, near what is now the intersection of Jefferson and Overland Boulevards. Short-lived Camp Kellogg was located nearby, just north across Ballona Creek.

Background 
While located well outside of disputed battleground of the American Civil War, the Union still saw fit to station active-duty troops in the west, to discourage rebel tendencies among the populace, protect supply and communications routes, and for the suppression of Indians. As a column in the Drum Barracks historical-site newsletter put it:

 

According to a history of Los Angeles written nearly 50 years later, "January 1862 was noted for the greatest flood in the history of California. It began raining December 24, 1861, and kept it up almost without cessation for a month." As more recent scholarship put it: the winter of 1861–1862 was "the wettest and coldest winter on the West Coast in the last three centuries." Animals and people drowned by the dozens, rivers washed away roads and bridges (cutting off supply and mail routes between Camp Latham, Los Angeles, and Fort Tejon), and everything that wasn't washed away was mired in mud.

History 
In 1861, during the American Civil War, Camp Latham was established by the 1st California Infantry under Col. James H. Carleton and the 1st California Cavalry under Lt. Col. Benjamin F. Davis. Named for California Senator Milton S. Latham, the camp was the first staging area for the training of Union troops and their operations in Southern California. Camp Kellogg, which may have been extant for no more than a month, was named for John Kellogg, who organized the 5th California Infantry Regiment. The camp may have been first established when Company A of the First Infantry arrived at the site on September 22, 1861.

By October 2, the local pro-Union newspaper Semi-Weekly Southern News reported that "three lines of stages now run regularly between the city and Camp Latham." On October 19, 1861 the Nevada Democrat reported, "Camp Latham is the name given to the encampment of volunteers near Los Angeles, where there are now stationed 769 infantry and 454 cavalry, making 1,223 troops in all." Companies D, G, I of the 2nd California Volunteers and companies F, G, and H of the 4th California Volunteers were stationed at Camp Latham.  

Camp Kellogg was seemingly established February 4, 1862 with the contents of 26 wagons and the soldiers of companies C, E, F, G, and I of the Fifth Regiment, arrived from San Pedro. A Fifth Regiment correspondent reported: "Camp Kellogg will be short lived, I think, as Camp Latham will soon be vacated by the First Regiment and we will take their place; they have a fine place, neatly arranged, and a clear, graveled parade ground. Only a portion of the regiment is there now, being companies K and C, First Infantry, and company C and a part of B, First Cavalry, who are without horses."

As of March 1862, per the Daily Alta California, "At Camp Latham there are three companies of cavalry and two of infantry. In Camp Kellogg, adjoining Camp Latham, there are six companies." The Alta California also reported that the rains had turned Ballona from a rill to a river, seemingly resulting in the demise of Camp Kellogg. 

Also that month an intoxicated soldier named George McDermott stabbed to death a local man named Guadalupe Moreno, at "a low liquor shanty operated by a Mexican" that located just outside the perimeter of Camp Latham. Per the Weekly Butte Record, "The murderer was sent to town under a guard of soldiers, and placed in jail. He attempted to escape after committing the deed. He is said to be only twenty years of age, and until this time was never known to drink, and had always borne a good character. A bill has been found against him for murder by the Grand Jury." McDermott was ultimately sentenced to 10 years "in the penitentiary" by the Los Angeles District Court. 

An expedition to the Owens River led by George S. Evans from Camp Latham resulted in the establishment of Camp Independence. Camp Independence was the base of the U.S. Army during the Owens Valley Indian War. The California Column also departed from Camp Latham. Approximately 36 camels from the U.S. Camel Corps were temporarily relocated to Camp Latham when Fort Tejon briefly closed. 

On the Fourth of July 1862, there was a "dress parade and grand review" before Col. Forman, Washington's Farewell Address and the Declaration of Independence were read aloud, there was a 100-gun salute to the Union, and finally soldiers from Camp Latham and their guests "visited the Willows, a beautiful grove on the right bank of Ballona Creek, for a promenade to enchanting music." The University of Iowa Libraries hold the 1862 diary of an unknown soldier stationed at Camp Latham who was assigned in August 1862 to escort a "specie train" to New Mexico Territory. On August 29, 1862, John Daker, age 42, of Company H, 4th Infantry and formerly of Poughkeepsie, New York, drowned in Ballona Creek while bathing. In September 1862, the U.S. military residents of the camp were accused of voting fraud and intimidation of election officials, "wherein the military took possession of the ballot box, and placed therein about 200 illegal votes for county and township officers—being the votes of soldiers in the service of the United States, who are not citizens of this county." The election officers reported their concerns about the conduct of the soldiers to the county. As James Miller Guinn told it in 1915: "The soldiers at Camp Latham at the September  election took possession of  the  polls and cast over two hundred votes for the Union  candidates for the legislature, defeating the Confederate  sympathizers on the Democratic ticket. A great outcry was raised by the defeated  candidates over the outrage and the vote of the precinct was thrown out."

In early October 1862 several newspapers reported that "The troops stationed at Camp Latham have been removed to San Pedro for Winter quarters. Two companies of cavalry, under Colonel Evans, now at Owens river, are to be stationed at Visalia." The troops never returned to Camp Latham, and the San Pedro post, then called Camp Drum, later became the still-extant Drum Barracks.

Description 
In October 1861 a Camp Latham soldier writing in the Daily Alta California expressed a desire for newspapers, and for good horses from Los Angeles (they currently had none), and provided this description of the site:

Sgt. Owen of the San Jose Volunteers wrote his mother, "Camp Latham is a fine spot, seven miles from Los Angeles, bounded by high, rough old mountains on the North—hills, and a perfect love of a brook to the South—sea on the West, and on the East, hills and forests."

On January 6, 1862 a "Letter from Camp Latham" was published in the Sacramento Daily Union. Full of references to ancient military history and political speculation, the writer also described the conditions of the camp:

In May 1862 the Trinity Journal published this account from "Charley," Co. H, 4th California Infantry Regiment:

Relative location
This is a table of distances (using original spelling as provided) between Camp Latham and Camp Wright via the wagon roads and footpaths of the day. Many of these locations were stops on the Butterfield Overland Mail in California that became U.S. Army camps during the Civil War era. This distances appeared in a guidebook to the western United States that was published just after the war in 1866.

See also 
 California in the American Civil War

Notes

References 

Closed installations of the United States Army
American Civil War army posts
Independence (California)
1861 establishments in California
1862 disestablishments in California
California in the American Civil War
History of Culver City, California